The Virtual Library of Virginia (VIVA) is the consortium of the nonprofit academic libraries within the Commonwealth of Virginia. Members include all of the 39 state-assisted colleges and universities (the six doctoral degree-granting universities, nine four-year institutions, and 24 community and two-year branch colleges), as well as 34 of the independent (private, nonprofit) institutions and the Library of Virginia.

VIVA is an active member of the International Coalition of Library Consortia.

History
The Virtual Library of Virginia was established in July 1994. In September 2003, VIVA received the Governor's Technology Gold Award for Government Service in Higher Education.

A Guide to the Virtual Library of Virginia (VIVA) Records, 1994-2004  is hosted on the George Mason University web site.

Organizational structure
VIVA operates under a memorandum of understanding (MOU). VIVA is headed by a steering committee with 15 members elected from the member institutions and supported by a variety of committees, also drawn from the constituent organizations. The three standing VIVA Committees are the Outreach Committee, Resources for Users Committee, and the Resource Sharing Committee. Operational responsibility for VIVA is conducted by the VIVA staff, currently the Director, Associate Director, and Executive Assistant. More information on the VIVA Organizational Plan  is located on VIVA web site.

Budget and funding
In fiscal year 2012, Virginia General Assembly funding represented 44% of the total VIVA budget (compared to 77% in fiscal year 2006) while VIVA member institutions increased their contributions to 56% of the total budget. The commitment of VIVA institutions to acquiring and providing key resources to the Virginia higher education community is extraordinary and reveals the power of the VIVA cooperative.  Previous biennial budgets allocated to VIVA by the General Assembly are posted on the VIVA site .

Member institutions

External links
 VIVA Home Page
 VIVA Member Libraries

University and college academic libraries in the United States
Libraries in Virginia
 Guide to VIVA Records